Rita Pereira may refer to:

 Rita Redshoes (Rita Pereira), Portuguese singer-songwriter
 Rita Pereira (actress), Portuguese actress and model
 Rita Pereira (water polo), Portuguese water polo player